Robert Creek is a stream in the U.S. state of Minnesota.

Robert Creek was named for Captain Louis Robert, an Indian trader.

References

Rivers of Scott County, Minnesota
Rivers of Sibley County, Minnesota
Rivers of Minnesota